Doctor Diego Ladrón de Guevara Orozco Calderón (1641 in Cifuentes, Spain – September 9, 1718) was a Roman Catholic bishop and Spanish colonial administrator. From August 30, 1710, to March 2, 1716, he was viceroy of Peru.

Before his term as viceroy
He studied theology at the University of Alcalá de Henares, where he was later professor of law. He also taught at the University of Sigüenza.

In 1689 he was appointed bishop of Panama and consecrated by Miguel Antonio de Benavides y Piedrola, Bishop of Cartagena. then in the Viceroyalty of Peru. That year he was jailed by order of Governor and Captain General José de Guzmán y Ávalos, with whom he had personal differences. In 1695 he added the additional responsibility of president of the Audiencia of Panama.

He served in Panama until 1699, when he was named bishop of Ayacucho (or Huamanga) in what is still Peru. He opened the University of San Cristóbal de Huamanga (founded in 1677) there, and was its first rector. This university was opposed by the older University of San Marcos. In 1703 he was appointed bishop of Quito (also in the Viceroyalty of Peru), where he served until his resignation in 1710 to take up the position of viceroy.

His administration
He replaced Miguel Núñez de Sanabria, president of the Audiencia of Lima, who had been serving as viceroy in an interim capacity. Ladrón de Guevara had been named in the sealed instructions brought by the previous viceroy, Manuel de Oms y de Santa Pau as the successor in the event of Oms's death.

As viceroy, he increased the production of silver in the mines of Potosí, and stimulated production in other mines at San Nicolás, Cajatambo and Huancavelica. He limited the manufacture of aguardiente from sugar cane to authorized factories, which he taxed heavily. He had to take measures against the threat of privateers, in spite of the signing of the Peace of Utrecht in 1713, and against an uprising of slaves at the hacienda of Huachipa de Lima.

He approved the reconstruction of the cathedral of Lima, and the construction of some other churches, including La Buena Muerte and the convent of Mínimos de San Francisco de Paula. He established a chair of anatomy at the University of San Marcos. The Peace of Utrecht allowed the British to send ships and merchandise to the fair at Portobello.

After his term as viceroy
He was denounced in the royal courts for embezzlement, and removed from office in 1716. He was replaced on an interim basis by Mateo de la Mata Ponce de León, president of the Audiencia of Lima. Ladrón de Guevara went to New Spain. Before his death there, he arranged that the remains of his relative, Diego Landa Calderón, former bishop of Yucatán, be returned to Spain. He died on September 9, 1718, in Mexico City and was buried in the cathedral there.

References

External links and additional sources
 (for Chronology of Bishops) 
 (for Chronology of Bishops) 
 (for Chronology of Bishops) 
 (for Chronology of Bishops) 
 (for Chronology of Bishops) 
 (for Chronology of Bishops)

External links
 Brief biography
 Short biography
 Some details of his administration
Information at Catholic Hierarchy
 University of San Cristóbal de Huamanga (.pdf document)

1641 births
1718 deaths
Viceroys of Peru
Royal Governors of Panama
17th-century Roman Catholic bishops in Peru
18th-century Roman Catholic bishops in Ecuador
17th-century Roman Catholic bishops in Panama
Roman Catholic bishops of Panamá
Roman Catholic bishops of Quito
Roman Catholic bishops of Ayacucho